The Best is a Sony PlayStation budget range in Japan and parts of Asia. Similar budget ranges include Greatest Hits in North America, Essentials in PAL regions and BigHit Series in Korea.

For the PlayStation, The Best was followed by PS one Books when the PS one was released in 2001. These games were top selling popular titles that were made available again in a low-priced version under this new label. Games released under the PS one Books label did not come in standard jewel cases like other PlayStation games, but instead came packaged in slim jewel cases. The games' instruction booklets were typically placed outside of the case, with both booklet and case sealed in plastic packaging. The software contained on the discs was usually the original retail game, however bug fixes were applied for a few titles. PS one Books titles were still being released until late 2006.

The first PlayStation 3 The Best titles were released on March 19, 2008. However Armored Core 4 had been prior released as early as January 10, 2008 in the Best Collection.

PlayStation

The Best

A. IV Evolution Global
A5: A-Ressha de Ikō 5 
Ace Combat
Ace Combat 2
Ace Combat 3: Electrosphere
Akagawa Jirō: Yasōkyoku
Akumajō Dracula X: Gekka no Yasōkyoku
Arc the Lad
Arc the Lad II
Arc the Lad III
Armored Core
Armored Core: Project Phantasma
Armored Core: Master of Arena
Bakusō Dekotora Densetsu: Art Truck Battle
Bakusō Dekotora Densetsu 2
Battle Arena Toshinden 2 Plus
Bass Landing 2
BioHazard 3: Last Escape
BioHazard: Gun Survivor
Bloody Roar: Hyper Beast Duel
Bloody Roar 2: Bringer of the New Age
Boku no Natsuyasumi
Bokujō Monogatari Harvest Moon
Boxer's Road
Breath of Fire III
Breath of Fire IV
Burger Burger
Bushido Blade
Bushido Blade 2
Chrono Trigger
Chrono Cross
Classic Road
Clock Tower 2
Cool Boarders
Cool Boarders 2
D no Shokutaku
Dai-4-Ji Super Robot Taisen S
Daisenryaku: Player's Spirit
Densetsu no Ogre Battle
Densha de Go!
Densha de Go! 2
Densha de Go! Professional
Devil Summoner: Soul Hackers
Diablo
Dino Crisis
Dino Crisis 2
Dokapon! Ikari no Tetsuken
Doko Demo Issho
Dragon Quest IV: Michibikareshi Monotachi
Dragon Quest VII: Eden no Senshi-tachi
Echo Night
Elie no Atelier: Salberg no Renkinjutsushi 2
FIFA: Road to World Cup 98 – World Cup e no Michi
Fighting Illusion: K-1 Revenge
Fighting Illusion: K-1 Grand Prix '98
Final Fantasy VII International
Final Fantasy VIII
Final Fantasy IX
Final Fantasy Tactics
Fish Eyes
Gakkō o Tsukurō!!
Gallop Racer 2: One and Only Road to Victory
Gallop Racer 2000
Gensō Suikoden
Gokujō Parodius Da! Deluxe Pack
Gradius Gaiden
Gran Turismo
Grandia
Gun Bullet
Gunbarl
 Hajime no Ippo: The Fighting!
Honkaku Pro Mahjong Tetsuman Special
Hōshin Engi
Hyper Olympic in Nagano
I.Q.: Intelligent Qube
I.Q.: Final
Initial D
Jet de Go!: Let's Go By Airliner
Kagero: Kokumeikan Shinsho
Kamen Rider
Kensetsu Kikai Simulator: Kenki Ippai!!
Kidō Senshi Gundam

Kidō Senshi Gundam Version 2.0
Kindaichi Shōnen no Jikenbo Hihōtō Arata Naru Sangeki
King's Field II
King's Field III
Klayman Klayman: Neverhood no Nazo 
Kokumeikan: Trap Simulation Game
Legaia Densetsu
Linda³ Again
Lunar: Silver Star Story Complete
Lupin III: Chateau de Cagliostro Saikai
Macross Digital Mission VF-X
Mahjong Taikai II Special
Maria: Kimitachi ga Umareta Wake
Marie no Atelier Plus: Salberg no Renkinjutsushi
Megami Ibunroku Persona
Menkyo o Torō
Minna no Golf
Minna no Golf 2
Monster Farm
Monster Farm 2
Moon: Remix RPG Adventure
Moonlight Syndrome
My Home Dream
Myst
Namco Museum Encore
Namco Museum Volume 1
Namco Museum Volume 2
Namco Museum Volume 3
Namco Museum Volume 4
Namco Museum Volume 5
Neo Atlas
Nobunaga no Yabou: Haōden
Nobunaga no Yabō: Tenshōki
Nobunaga no Yabō: Shōseiroku
Nobunaga no Yabō: Reppūden
NOëL: NOT DiGITAL
Option Tuning Car Battle
Ore no Ryōri
Ore no Shikabane o Koete Yuke
OverBlood
OverBlood 2
Pachi-Slot Kanzen Kōryaku 3
PAL: Shinken Densetsu
PaRappa the Rapper
Parlor! Pro
Parlor! Pro 2
Parlor! Pro 4
Persona 2: Tsumi
Persona 2: Batsu
Pilot ni Narō! 
Policenauts
PoPoLoCrois Monogatari
PoPoLoCrois Monogatari II
Pro Mahjong Kiwame Plus
Puyo Puyo Tsu Ketteiban
Puyo Puyo SUN Ketteiban
R?MJ: The Mystery Hospital
RayStorm
Real Bout Garō Densetsu
Rebus
Ridge Racer
Ridge Racer Revolution
Rittai Ninja Katsugeki Tenchu: Shinobi Gaisen
RPG Tsukūru 4
Runabout
Rurouni Kenshin: Meiji Kenkaku Romantan: Ishin Gekitōhen
Rurouni Kenshin: Meiji Kenkaku Romantan: Jūyūshi Inbō Hen
Samurai Spirits: Zankuro Musōken

Sangokushi IV
Sangokushi V
Sangokushi VI
SD Gundam: G Century
SD Gundam: G Generation
Sentō Kokka: Air Land Battle
Sentō Kokka Kai Improved
Shin Nippon Pro Wrestling: Toukon Retsuden
Shin Super Robot Taisen
Shin Theme Park
Shinsetsu Samurai Spirits Bushidō Retsuden
Shutokō Battle: Drift King
Shutokō Battle R
Sidewinder USA
Sidewinder 2
SimCity 2000
Simulation RPG Tsukūru
Sōmatō
Soul Edge
Sound Novel Evolution 1: Otogirisō Sosei-Hen
Sound Novel Evolution 2: Kamaitachi no Yoru Tokubetsu Hen
Street Fighter EX Plus α
Street Fighter Zero 2'
Super Robot Taisen F
Super Robot Taisen F Kanketsuhen
Taikō Risshiden II
Taiyō no Shippo: Wild, Pure, Simple Life
Tales of Destiny
Tales of Eternia
Tales of Phantasia
Tamamayu Monogatari
Tekken
Tekken 2
Tekken 3
The Conveni: Ano Machi wo Dokusen Seyo
The King of Fighters '95
The King of Fighters '96
The King of Fighters '97
The Raiden Project
Theme Park
Time Crisis
Tokimeki Memorial: Forever With You
Tomb Raider
Tomb Raider II
Touge Max: Saisoku Driver Master
Touge Max 2
True Love Story
Tsuwadō Seabass Fishing
Ultraman Fighting Evolution
UmJammer Lammy
Valkyrie Profile
Vandal Hearts
Vandal Hearts II
Vib-Ribbon
Vigilante 8
V-Rally Championship Edition
Wild ARMs
Wild ARMs: 2nd Ignition
Winning Post 2: Program '96
Winning Post 3
Wizardry: Llylgamyn Saga
World Neverland: Olerud Ōkoku Monogatari
World Neverland 2: Pluto Kyōwakoku Monogatari
XI sai
XI [sai] Jumbo
Yarudora Series Vol. 1: Double Cast
Yarudora Series Vol. 2: Kisetsu o Dakishimete
Yarudora Series Vol. 3: Sampaguita
Yarudora Series Vol. 4: Yukiwari no Hana
Yu-Gi-Oh! Monster Capsule Breed & Battle
Zero Pilot: Fighter of Silver Wing

The Best for Family

Bakusō Kyōdai Let's & Go!!: WGP Hyper Heat
Bomberman Fantasy Race
Bomberman World
Choro Q Ver 1.02
Choro Q 2
Choro Q 3
Choro Q Marine: Q-Boat
Choro Q Wonderful!
Crash Bandicoot
Crash Bandicoot 2: Cortex Strikes Back
Crash Bandicoot 3: Flying! Globe-Trotting
Crash Bandicoot Racing
Detana TwinBee Yahoo! Deluxe Pack
Digimon World
Dragon Ball Z: Idainaru Dragon Ball Densetsu
Dragon Ball Z: Ultimate Battle 22
Dragon Ball Final Bout

DX Jinsei Game
DX Jinsei Game II
DX Nippon Tokkyu Ryokō Game
DX Okuman Chōja Game
Ganbare Goemon: Uchū Kaizoku Akogingu
Gucho de Park: Theme Park Monogatari
Hermie Hopperhead: Scrap Panic
Iwatobi Penguin Rocky X Hopper
Kawa no Nushi Tsuri: Hikyou o Motomete
Kaze no Klonoa: Door to Phantomile
Meitantei Conan
Momotarō Densetsu
Momotarō Dentetsu 7
Motor Toon Grand Prix USA Edition
Nyan to Wonderful
Pocket Fighter

Puzzle Bobble 2
Puzzle Bobble 3 DX
Rockman 8: Metal Heroes
Rockman Battle & Chase
Rockman DASH Hagane no Bōkenshin
Rockman DASH 2 – Episode 2: Great Inheritance
Rockman X3
Rockman X4
Rockman X5
Rockman X6
Saru! Get You!
Smash Court
Susume! Taisen Puzzle-Dama
Tetris X
Time Bokan Series: Bokan to Ippatsu! Doronbo
Tron ni Kobun

PS one Books

20 Reiki Striker Retsuden
Akagawa Jirō: Majotachi no Nemuri: Fukkatsusai
Akagawa Jirō: Yasōkyoku
Akagawa Jirō: Yasōkyoku 2
Akumajō Dracula X: Gekka no Yasōkyoku
America Ōdan Ultra Quiz
Arc the Lad
Arc the Lad II
Arc the Lad III
Armored Core
Armored Core: Project Phantasma
Armored Core: Master of Arena
Beltlogger 9
Bishi Bashi Special
Bishi Bashi Special 2
Bishi Bashi Special 3: Step Champ
Bokujō Monogatari Harvest Moon for Girl
Bomberman Fantasy Race
Bomberman Land
Charamela
Chocobo Racing
Choro Q 3
Choro Q Jet: Rainbow Wings
Choro Q Wonderful!
Choro Q Marine: Q-Boat
Chrono Trigger
Chrono Cross
Colin McRae the Rally
Colin McRae the Rally 2
Combat Choro Q
Crash Bandicoot
Crash Bandicoot 2: Cortex Strikes Back
Crash Bandicoot 3: Flying! Globe-Trotting
Crash Bandicoot Carnival
Crash Bandicoot Racing
Croket! Kindan no Kinka Box
Denkō Sekka Micro Runner
Detana TwinBee Yahoo! Deluxe Pack
Devil Summoner: Soul Hackers
Dewprism
Digital Glider Airman
Dōkyu Re-Mix: Billiards Multiple
Dragon Quest IV: Michibikareshi Monotachi
Dragon Quest VII: Eden no Senshi-tachi
DX Jinsei Game V
DX Okuman Chōja Game II
DX Shachō Game
Echo Night
Echo Night #2: Nemuri no Shihaisha
Ehrgeiz
Enen Angel
Exciting Pro Wrestling 2
Fever: Sankyo Kōshiki Pachinko Simulation
Fever 2: Sankyo Kōshiki Pachinko Simulation
Fever 3: Sankyo Kōshiki Pachinko Simulation
Fever 4: Sankyo Kōshiki Pachinko Simulation
Fever 5: Sankyo Kōshiki Pachinko Simulation
Final Fantasy Tactics
Final Fantasy VII International
Fish Eyes
Fish Eyes II
Front Mission 3
Gakkō o Tsukurō!!
Gakkō o Tsukurō!! 2
Gallop Racer 3
Ganbare Goemon: Ōedo Daikaiten
Ganbare Goemon: Uchū Kaizoku Akogingu

GeGeGe no Kitarō: Gyakushū! Yōkai Daichisen
Gekitotsu Toma L'Arc: TomaRunner vs L'Arc-en-Ciel
Shovel Master Ninarou! KENKI Ippatsu!
Gensō Suikoden
Gensō Suikoden II
Gensō Suikogaiden Vol.1: Harmonia no Kenshi
Gensō Suikogaiden Vol.2 Kurisutaru Barē no Kettō
GetBackers Dakkanoku
Goemon: Shin Sedai Shūmei!
Gokujō Parodius Da! Deluxe Pack
Gradius Gaiden
Gran Turismo
Gran Turismo 2
Great Rugby Jikkyō '98
Groove Adventure Rave: Mikan no Hiseki
Groove Adventure Rave: Yūkyū no Kizuna
Gucho de Park: Theme Park Monogatari
Hai-Shin 2
Hunter × Hunter: Maboroshi no Greed Island
Hunter × Hunter: Ubawareta Aura Stone
I.Q.: Final
Kagero: Kokumeikan Shinsho
Kawa no Nushi Tsuri: Hikyō o Motomete
Kensetsu Kikai Simulator: Kenki Ippai!!
Kero Kero King
King's Field
King's Field II
King's Field III
Kokumeikan: Trap Simulation Game
Lake Masters Pro
Little Princess: Marl Ōkoku no Ningyō Hime 2
Megami Ibunroku Persona
Metal Gear Solid
Metal Gear Solid: Integral
Metal Slug
Mezase! Meimon Yakyubu
MiniMoni: Dice de Pyon!
Momotarō Densetsu
Momotarō Dentetsu V
Momotarō Dentetsu 7
Mushi Tarō
My Home Dream
Neko na Ka-n-ke-I
Ōma ga Toki
Ōma ga Toki 2
Ore no Ryōri
Ore no Shikabane o Koete Yuke
Pachi-Slot Aruze Ōkoku 2
Pachi-Slot Aruze Ōkoku 4
PaRappa the Rapper
Parasite Eve 2
Policenauts
PoPoLoCrois Monogatari
PoPoLoCrois Monogatari II
PoPoLoGue
Quiz $ Millionaire
Quiz $ Millionaire: Waku Waku Party
Quiz Darakeno Jinsei Game Dai-2-kai!
R4: Ridge Racer Type 4
Racing Lagoon
Reikoku: Ikeda Kizoku Shinrei Kenkyūjo
Rockman
Rockman 2: Dr. Wily no Nazo
Rockman 3: Dr. Wily no Saigo!?
Rockman 4: Aratanaru Yabō!!
Rockman 5: Blues no Wana!?
Rockman 6: Shijōsai Dai no Tatakai!!
Rockman X4

SaGa Frontier
SaGa Frontier 2
Samurai Spirits: Zankuro Musōken
Samurai Spirits: Amakusa Kōrin Special
Saru! Get You!
Seiji o Asobō: Potestas
Seiken Densetsu: Legend of Mana
Senryaku Shidan: Tora! Tora! Tora! Rikusenhen
Shin Theme Park
Shutokō Battle R
Silent Hill
Sister Princess
Sister Princess 2
Slap Happy Rhythm Busters
Smash Court
Soul Edge
Sound Novel Evolution 3: Machi – Unmei no Kōsaten
Star Ocean: The Second Story
Submarine Hunter Sya-Chi
Summon Night
Summon Night 2
Super Robot Taisen Alpha
Super Robot Taisen Alpha Gaiden
Taiyō no Shippo: Wild, Pure, Simple Life
Tamamayu Monogatari
Tenkū no Restaurant
Tennis no Ōjisama
The Adventure of Puppet Princess: Marl Ōkoku no Ningyō Himee 
The Bombing Islands: Kid Klown no Krazy Puzzle
The King of Fighters '97
The King of Fighters '98
Theme Aquarium
Tokimeki Memorial: Forever With You
Tokimeki Memorial 2 Substories: Dancing Summer Vacation
Tokimeki Memorial 2 Substories: Leaping School Festival
Tokimeki Memorial 2 Substories: Memories Ringing On
Tokimeki Memorial Drama Series Vol.1: Nijiiro no Seishun
Tokimeki Memorial Drama Series Vol.2: Irodori no Love Song
Tokimeki Memorial Drama Series Vol.3: Tabidachi no Uta
Tokimeki Memorial Taisen Puzzle-Dama
Tokimeki Memorial 2 Taisen Puzzle-Dama
Tokimeki no Houkago
Tomb Raider
Tomb Raider II
Tora! Tora! Tora!
Twilight Syndrome Saikai
Twinbee RPG
Umi no Nushi Tsuri: Takarajima ni Mukatte
UmJammer Lammy
Urawaza Mahjong: Korette Tenwatte Yatsukai
Vagrant Story
Valkyrie Profile
Vampire Hunter D
Vandal Hearts
Vandal Hearts II
Vib-Ribbon
V-Rally Championship Edition
V-Rally Championship Edition 2
Wild ARMs
Wild ARMs: 2nd Ignition
WTC: World Touring Car Championship
Xenogears
XI sai
Yu-Gi-Oh! Monster Capsule Breed & Battle
Yu-Gi-Oh! Shin Dual Monsters
Zen-Nippon Pro Wrestling: Ōja no Kon

PlayStation 2

.hack//G.U. Vol. 1
.hack//G.U. Vol. 2: Kimi Omō Koe
.hack//G.U. Vol. 3: Aruku Yōna Hayasa de
.hack//Vol. 1 x Vol. 2
.hack//Vol. 3 x Vol. 4
A.C.E.: Another Century's Episode
Ace Combat 04: Shattered Skies
Ace Combat 5: The Unsung War
Ace Combat: The Belkan War
Ar tonelico: Sekai no Owari de Utai Tsudzukeru Shōjo
Ar tonelico II: Sekai ni Hibiku Shōjo-tachi no Metafalica
Armored Core 2
Armored Core 2: Another Age
Armored Core 3
Armored Core 3: Silent Line
Armored Core: Last Raven
Armored Core: Nexus
Bakusō Dekotora Densetsu: Otoko Hanamichi Yume Roman
BioHazard 4
BioHazard Outbreak
Bleach: Blade Battlers
Bleach: Erabareshi Tamashii
Bleach: Hanatareshi Yaboō
Bloody Roar 3
Boku no Natsuyasumi 2
Boku to Maō
Bokujō Monogatari 3: Heart ni Hi o Tsukete
Bokujō Monogatari: Oh! Wonderful Life
Bomberman Land 2
Bravo Music
Breath of Fire V: Dragon Quarter
Busin: Wizardry Alternative
Capcom Vs. SNK 2: Millionaire Fighting 2001
Crash Bandicoot 4: Sakuretsu! Majin Power
Culdcept II Expansion
Dai-2-Ji Super Robot Taisen Alpha
Dai-3-Ji Super Robot Taisen Alpha: Shūen no Ginga e
Dark Cloud
Dark Chronicle
Dead or Alive 2: Hardcore
Demento
Dennō Senki Virtual-On: Marz
Densha de Go! Final
Densha de Go! Shinkansen
Devil May Cry
Devil May Cry 3: Special Edition
Dirge of Cerberus: Final Fantasy VII International
Dragon Ball Z
Dragon Ball Z 2
Dragon Ball Z 3
Energy Airforce
Exciting Pro Wrestling 3
EX Jinsei Game II
Extermination
Fate/stay night Réalta Nua
Final Fantasy X
Fu-un Bakumatsu-den
Fu-un Shinsengumi
Galacta Meisaku Gekijoō: Rakugaki Ōkoku
Gallop Racer 6: Revolution
Gambler Densetsu Tetsuya
Genji
Gensō Suikoden IV
Gensō Suikoden V
God Hand
Gran Turismo 3: A-Spec
Gran Turismo 4
Gran Turismo 4 Prologue
Gran Turismo Concept: 2001 Tokyo
Guilty Gear X Plus
Guilty Gear XX: The Midnight Carnival
Gundam True Odyssey: Ushinawareta G no Densetsu
GunGriffon Blaze
Gun Survivor 2 – BioHazard – Code: Veronica
Hajime no Ippo: Victorious Boxers- Championship Version
ICO
Ikusa Gami

Initial D: Special Stage
Jak & Daxter: The Precursor Legacy
Ka
Kagero 2: Dark Illusion
Kamaitachi no Yoru 2
Katamari Damacy
Kaze no Klonoa 2: Sekai ga Nozonda Wasuremono
Kengo
Kengo 2
Kengo 3
Kenka Banchō
Kenka Banchō 2: Full Throttle
Kessen
Kessen II
Kessen III
Kidō Senshi Gundam Seed Destiny: Rengō vs. Z.A.F.T. II Plus
Kidō Senshi Gundam: Giren no Yabō – Axis no Kyōi V
Kidō Senshi Gundam: Renpō vs. Zeon DX
Kidō Senshi Z Gundam: AEUG Vs. Titans
Kinnikuman: Generations
Kotoba no Puzzle: Mojipittan
Legaia: Duel Saga
Lupin III: Majutsu-Ō no Isan
Magna Carta: Tears of Blood
Makai Senki Disgaea
Makai Senki Disgaea 2
Maximo
Metal Gear Solid 2: Sons of Liberty
Metal Gear Solid 2: Substance
Metal Gear Solid 3: Snake Eater
Metal Saga: Sajin no Kusari
Minna Daisuki Katamari Damacy
Minna no Golf 3
Minna no Golf 4
Minna no Tennis 
Momotarō Dentetsu 12: Nishinihon Hen mo ari Masse!
Momotarō Dentetsu 15: Godai Bombi Toujou! No Maki
Momotarō Dentetsu 16: Moving in Hokkaido!
Momotarō Dentetsu USA
Monster Farm 4
Monster Hunter G
Monster Hunter 2
Musou Orochi
Musou Orochi: Maō Sairin
Namco × Capcom
Naruto: Narutimate Hero
Naruto: Narutimate Hero 2
Naruto: Narutimate Hero 3
New Jinsei Game
Nobunaga no Yabō: Kakushin
Nobunaga no Yabō: Tenka Sōsei
Odin Sphere
Ōkami
Onimusha
Onimusha 2
Operator's Side
PaRappa the Rapper 2
Persona 3: Fes
Persona 4
Phantasy Star Universe
Phantom Brave
Pilot ni Narō! 2
Pipo Saru 2001
PoPoLoCrois: Hajimari no Bouken
Puyo Puyo Fever
Ratchet & Clank
Ratchet & Clank 2: GaGaGa! Ginga no Komandossu
Ratchet & Clank 3: Totsugeki! Galactic Rangers
Ratchet & Clank 4th: GiriGiri Ginga no Giga Battle
Rez
Ridge Racer V
Rogue Galaxy Director's Cut
R-Type Final
Rurouni Kenshin: Meiji Kenkaku Romantan: Enjō! Kyōto Rinne
Ryū ga Gotoku
Ryū ga Gotoku 2
Samurai Dou: Kanzenban

Samurai Dou 2: Kettōban
Sangokushi VII
Saru! Get You! 2
Saru! Get You! 3
Saru! Get You: Million Monkeys
Sengoku BASARA
Sengoku BASARA 2
Sengoku BASARA 2 Heroes
Sengoku BASARA X
Sengoku Musou
Sengoku Musou Moushouden
Sengoku Musou 2 
Sengoku Musou 2 Empires 
Seven: Molmorth no Kiheitai 
Shadow Hearts
Shadow Hearts II: Director's Cut
Shin Onimusha: Dawn of Dreams
Shin Sangoku Musou 2
Shin Sangoku Musou 3
Shin Sangoku Musou 3 MoushoudenShin Sangoku Musou 4Shin Sangoku Musou 4 EmpiresShin Sangoku Musou 4 MoushoudenShining Force EXAShining TearsShining WindShinobiShutokō Battle 0Shutokō Battle 01Sidewinder MaxSirenSiren 2Space Channel 5 Part 2Star Ocean: Till the End of Time – Director's CutSummon Night 3Super Robot Taisen ImpactSuper Robot Taisen OG: Original GenerationsSuper Robot Wars ZSuzumiya Haruhi no TomadoiTaiko no Tatsujin: Appare SandaimeTaiko no Tatsujin: Go! Go! GodaimeTaiko no Tatsujin: Waku Waku Anime MatsuriTales of Destiny 2Tales of LegendiaTales of SymphoniaTales of the AbyssTear Ring Saga: Berwick SagaTekken 4Tekken 5Tekken Tag TournamentTenchu KurenaiTenchu SanTengai Makyō II: ManjimaruTengai Makyō III: NamidaTime Crisis IIToro to KyūjitsuTourist TrophyTrue Crime: New York CityUltramanUltraman Fighting Evolution 2Valkyrie Profile 2: SilmeriaVampire NightVenus & Braves: Majo to Megami to Horobi no YogenWander to KyozōWild ARMs: Advanced 3rdWild ARMs: Alter Code FWild ARMs: The 4th DetonatorWild ARMs: The 5th VanguardWRC: World Rally ChampionshipXenosaga Episode I: Der Wille zur MachtXenosaga Episode II: Jenseits von Gut und BöseYū Yū Hakusho Forever Z.O.E.: Zone of the EndersZeroZero II: Akai ChōZero III: Shisei no KoeZettai Zetsumei ToshiPlayStation 3Ace Combat: Assault HorizonAfrikaAkiba's Trip: Undead & Undressed (Asia only)Alice: Madness Returns (Asia only)Ar tonelico Qoga: Knell of Ar CielArmored Core 4Armored Core: For AnswerArmy of Two (Asia only)Assassin's Creed (Asia only)Assassin's Creed II (Asia only)Assassin's Creed III (Asia only)Assassin's Creed: Revelations (Asia only)Battlefield 3Battlefield: Bad Company (Asia only)Battlefield: Bad Company 2 (Asia only)BayonettaResident Evil 5 (Asia only)BioHazard 5: Alternative Edition Resident Evil 6BioHazard Chronicles HD SelectionBioHazard HD RemasterResident Evil: RevelationsResident Evil: Revelations 2Resident EvilBladestorm: Hyakunen SensōBlazBlue: Calamity Trigger (Asia only)BlazBlue: Chrono PhantasmaBlazBlue: Continuum Shift ExtendBleach: Soul IgnitionBoku no Natsuyasumi 3Burnout Paradise: The Ultimate Box (Asia only)Crysis 2 (Asia only)Dai-3-Ji Super Robot Taisen Z Jigoku-henDarksiders: Shinpan no Toki (Asia only)Dead Rising 2 Dead Space (Asia only)Dead Space 2 (Asia only)Demon's SoulsDevil May Cry 4Devil May Cry HD CollectionDisgaea Dimension 2Dragon Age: OriginsDragon Ball Z: Ultimate Tenkaichi Dragon's DogmaDragon Quest BuildersDragon Quest Heroes: The World Tree's Woe and the Blight Below (Asia only)Driver: San Francisco (Asia only)Earth Defense Force: Insect ArmageddonThe Legend of Heroes: Trails of Cold SteelEnchant ArmAtelier Escha & Logy: Alchemists of the Dusk SkyFallout 3 Fallout 3: Game of the Year Edition Fallout: New VegasFar Cry 3 (Asia Only)FIFA 11 (Asia only)FIFA 12 (Asia only)Fight Night Round 4 (Asia only)Final Fantasy XIIIFinal Fantasy XIII-2FolksSoul: Ushinawareta DenshōGod of War IIIHeavy RainInFamousInFamous 2Initial D Extreme StageJust Dance 4 (Asia only)Katamari ForeverKidō Senshi Gundam: Extreme VSKidō Senshi Gundam: Extreme VS Full BoostKidō Senshi Gundam: Target in SightKidō Senshi Gundam Senki Record U.C. 0081Killzone 2Killzone 3LittleBigPlanetLittleBigPlanet 2Lost Planet: Extreme ConditionLost Planet 2Macross 30: Ginga o Tsunagu UtagoeMAG: Massive Action GameDisgaea 3: Absence of JusticeAtelier Meruru: The Apprentice of ArlandMetal Gear Solid 4: Guns of the PatriotsMetal Gear Solid HD CollectionMetal Gear Solid: Peace Walker HD EditionMinna no Golf 5Minna no Golf 6Monster Hunter Portable 3rd HD Ver.Warriors Orochi 3eNaruto: Ultimate Ninja StormNaruto Shippuden: Ultimate Ninja Storm 2Need for Speed: Carbon (Asia only)Need for Speed: ProStreet (Asia only)Need for Speed: Shift (Asia only)Need for Speed: Undercover (Asia only)NieR ReplicantNinja Gaiden SigmaNinja Gaiden Sigma 2Ninja Gaiden 3: Razor's Edge (Asia only)Nobunaga no Yabō: TendōNobunaga no Yabō: Tendō with Power-Up KitNobunaga no Yabō: SōzōNo More Heroes: Red Zone EditionŌkami HDPrince of Persia (Asia only)Ratchet & Clank FutureResistance: Fall of ManResistance 2Ridge Racer 7Rocksmith 2014 (Asia only)Rise from LairRune Factory OceansRyū ga Gotoku 1&2 HD Edition (Asia only)Ryū ga Gotoku 3Ryū ga Gotoku 4Ryū ga Gotoku 5Ryū ga Gotoku Kenzan!Ryū ga Gotoku: Of the End (Asia only)Rorona no Atelier: Arland no RenkinjutsushiSacred 2: Fallen AngelSaint Seiya SenkiSamurai Dou 3 PlusSamurai Dou 4 PlusSangokushi XIISengoku BASARA 3Sengoku BASARA 3 UtageSengoku BASARA 4 SumeragiSengoku Musou 3 ZSengoku Musou 3 EmpiresSengoku Musou 4Senjō no VarukyuriaShallie no Atelier: Tasogare no Umi no RenkinjutsushiShin Kamaitachi no Yoru: 11 Hitome no SuspectShin Sangoku Musou 6Shin Sangoku Musou 6 Moushouden (Asia only)Shin Sangoku Musou 7 (Asia only)Shining ResonanceShirokishi Monogatari: Hikari to Yami no KakuseiSIREN: New TranslationSoulcalibur IVStar Ocean: The Last Hope InternationalStreet Fighter IV (Asia only)Super Street Fighter IV (Asia only)Super Street Fighter IV: Arcade EditionTales of Graces fTales of VesperiaTales of XilliaTales of Xillia 2Tears to Tiara: Kakan no Daichi (Asia only)Tekken 6Tekken Tag Tournament 2The Elder Scrolls IV: Oblivion The Elder Scrolls IV: Oblivion – Game of the Year Edition The Elder Scrolls V: SkyrimThe Elder Scrolls V: Skyrim – Legendary EditionThe Idolm@ster 2The Idolm@ster: One for AllThe Last of UsThe Orange Box (Asia only)Tom Clancy's Ghost Recon Advanced Warfighter 2 (Asia only)Tom Clancy's Rainbow Six: VegasTom Clancy's Splinter Cell: Double Agent (Asia only)Tokyo JungleToro to Morimori (Asia only)Totori no Atelier: Arland no Renkinjutsushi 2Trusty Bell: Chopin no Yume RepriseUncharted: El Dorado no HihōUncharted 2: Ougontō to Kieta Sendan Uncharted 3: Sabaku ni Nemuru Atlantis Ultra Street Fighter IVVirtua Fighter 5Wangan MidnightWarhawk (Asia only)Watch Dogs (Asia only)World Soccer Winning Eleven 2009 (Asia only)World Soccer Winning Eleven 2010 (Asia only)World Soccer Winning Eleven 2011 (Asia only)World Soccer Winning Eleven 2012 (Asia only)World Soccer Winning Eleven 2013 (Asia only)WWE SmackDown vs. Raw 2010 (Asia only)Zone of the Enders HD EditionPlayStation 4Assassin's Creed IV: Black FlagAssassin's Creed UnityAssassin's Creed SyndicateBattlefield 4Battlefield HardlineBioHazard 7: Resident Evil – Gold Edition (Asia Only)BioHazard: Origins CollectionBioHazard: Revelations 2BloodborneChikyū Bōeigun 4.1: The Shadow of New DespairDestiny: The Collection (Asia Only)Detroit: Become HumanDevil May Cry 4: Special EditionDragon Age: InquisitionDragon Quest Heroes: Yamiryū to Sekaiju no Shiro (Asia Only)Dragon Quest BuildersDriveclubF1 2015 (Asia Only)Far Cry 4 (Asia Only)Far Cry Primal (Asia Only)Fate/ExtellaFirewall: Zero HourFinal Fantasy X/X-2 HD RemasterFinal Fantasy Type-0 HD (Asia Only)God of War III Remastered (Asia Only)Gran Turismo Sport Spec IIGravity Daze RemasteredGravity Daze 2Hitokui no Ōwashi TricoInfamous First Light (Asia Only)Infamous Second SonJust Dance 2014 (Asia Only)Just Dance 2015 (Asia Only)Just Dance 2016 (Asia Only)Just Dance 2017 (Asia Only)Killzone: Shadow FallKnack (Asia Only)Knack II (Asia Only)LittleBigPlanet 3Makai Senki Disgaea 5Monster Hunter: WorldNeed for Speed: RivalsNew Danganronpa V3: Minna no Koroshiai ShingakkiNew Minna no GolfPersona 5Psycho Break (Asia Only)Ratchet & Clank: The GameRayman Legends (Asia Only)Ryū ga Gotoku 0Ryū ga Gotoku Ishin!Ryū ga Gotoku KiwamiSengoku BASARA 4 SumeragiSleeping Dogs Definitive Edition (Asia Only)Senjō no Varukyuria Remaster (Asia Only)Spider-ManTearaway Unfolded (Asia Only)The Crew (Asia Only)The Last of Us RemasteredThe Order: 1886 (Asia Only)Tom Clancy's Rainbow Six Siege (Asia Only)Tom Clancy's The Division (Asia Only)Tomb Raider The Definitive EditionUncharted CollectionUncharted 4: Kaizokuō to Saigo no HihōUntil DawnWander to KyozōWatch Dogs (Asia Only)Winning Eleven 2015 (Asia Only)Winning Eleven 2017 (Asia Only)

PlayStation Portable.hack//Link7th Dragon 2020Ace Combat X: Skies of DeceptionAce Combat X2: Joint AssaultArmored Core: Formula Front InternationalAssassin's Creed: BloodlinesByte Hell 2000Bleach: Heat the SoulBleach: Heat the Soul 2Bleach: Heat the Soul 3Bleach: Heat the Soul 4Bleach: Heat the Soul 5Bleach: Heat the Soul 6Bleach: Heat the Soul 7Bleach: Soul CarnivalBokujō Monogatari: Harvest Moon Boy and GirlBokujō Monogatari: Sugar Mura to Minna no NegaiBoku no Natsuyasumi PortableBoku no Natsuyasumi Portable 2Boku no Natsuyasumi 4Boku no Watashi no Katamari DamacyBreath of Fire IIIChikyū Bōeigun 2 PortableClank & Ratchet: Maru Hi Mission * IgnitionCoded ArmsCode Geass: Hangyaku no Lelōch – Lost ColorsConception: Ore no Kodomo o Unde Kure!!Crisis Core: Final Fantasy VIIDai-2-Ji Super Robot Taisen Z Hakai-henDai-2-Ji Super Robot Taisen Z Saisei-henDanganronpa: Kibō no Gakuen to Zetsubō no KōkōseiDead or Alive ParadiseDerby TimeDissidia Final FantasyDissidia Final Fantasy: Universal TuningDissidia 012 Final FantasyDoko Demo IsshoDoko Demo Issho: Let's Gakkō!Dragon Ball Z Tag VSDragoneer's AriaThe Legend of Heroes II: Prophecy of the Moonlight WitchThe Legend of Heroes IV: A Tear of VermillionThe Legend of Heroes III: Song of the OceanThe Legend of Heroes: Trails from ZeroThe Legend of Heroes: Trails in the SkyThe Legend of Heroes: Trails in the Sky SCThe Legend of Heroes: Trails in the Sky the 3rdThe Legend of Heroes: Trails to AzureThe Legend of Nayuta: Boundless TrailsExit (Asia only)Fairy Tail: Portable GuildFairy Tail: Portable Guild 2 Fate/ExtraFate/Extra CCCFinal FantasyFinal Fantasy IIFinal Fantasy IV: The Complete CollectionFinal Fantasy Tactics: The War of the LionsFinal Fantasy Type-0God Eater Burst God Eater 2Gran TurismoGrand Knights History Gensō Suikoden: Tsumugareshi Hyakunen no TokiGundam Assault SurviveGundam Battle ChronicleGundam Battle RoyaleGundam Battle UniverseGundam Memories: Tatakai no Kioku Initial D Street StageInnocent Life: Shin Bokujō Monogatari (Asia only)Jeanne D'ArcKen to Mahō to Gakuen Mono.Ken to Mahō to Gakuen Mono. 2Kenka Banchō 3: Zenkoku SeihaKenka Banchō 4: Ichinen SensōKenka Banchō 5: Otoko no HōsokuKidō Senshi Gundam Seed: Rengō vs. Z.A.F.T. PortableKidō Senshi Gundam: Shin Gihren no YabōKidō Senshi Gundam: Giren no Yabō – Axis no KyōiKidō Senshi Gundam: Giren no Yabō – Axis no Kyōi VKidō Senshi Gundam: Gundam vs. GundamKidō Senshi Gundam: Gundam vs. Gundam Next PlusKingdom Hearts Birth by SleepKingdom Hearts Birth by Sleep Final MixK-On! Hōkago Live!!Kotoba no Puzzle: Mojipittan DaijitenKuroko no Basuke: Kiseki no GameKurohyō: Ryū ga Gotoku ShinshōKurohyō 2: Ryū ga Gotoku Ashura-hen (Asia only)LocoRocoLocoRoco 2LittleBigPlanet (Asia only)LuminesMacross Ace FrontierMacross Ultimate FrontierMacross Triangle Frontier Magna Carta PortableMakai Senki Disgaea 2 PortableMahjong Fight ClubMahō Shōjo Ririkaru NanohaA's Portable: The Battle of AcesMahō Shōjo Ririkaru NanohaA's Portable: The Gears of DestinyMetal Gear AcidMetal Gear Acid 2Metal Gear Solid: Portable OpsMetal Gear Solid: Peace WalkerMinna no Golf Portable Minna no Golf Portable 2Minna no Tennis PortableMonHun Nikki: Poka Poka Ailu MuraMonster Hunter PortableMonster Hunter Portable 2nd GMonster Hunter Portable 3rdMugen KairōNamco MuseumNaruto Shippuden: Narutimate Accel 3Naruto: Narutimett Portable Mugenjō no MakiNaruto Shippuden: Narutimate ImpactNeed for Speed: Underground RivalsOre no Imōto ga Konna ni Kawaii Wake ga Nai Portable ga Tsuzuku Wake ga NaiPataponPatapon 2Patapon 3Persona (Asia only)Persona 3: PortablePhantasy Star PortablePhantasy Star Portable 2PoPoLoCrois Monogatari: Pietro Ōji no BōkenPop'n Music Portable 2Photo KanoPrince of Persia: Rival Swords (Asia only)Puzzle Bobble Pocket (Asia only)Pipo Saru AcademiaPipo Saru Academia 2Princess CrownPuzzle Bobble Pocket (Asia only)Queen's Blade: Spiral ChaosQuiz Kidō Senshi Gundam: Toi Senshi DXRatchet & Clank 5: Gekitotsu! Dodeka Ginga no MiriMiri Gundan Rengoku: Tower of PurgatoryRidge RacersSakura Wars 1 & 2Samurai Dou PortableSamurai Dou 2 PortableSaru Get You P!Saru Get You: Pipo Saru RacerSaru Get You: SaruSaru DaisakusenSD Gundam G Generation PortableSD Gundam G Generation WorldSD Gundam G Generation OverworldSengoku BASARA Battle HeroesShirokishi Monogatari Episode Portable: Dogma Wars Shin Sangoku Musou: Multi RaidSpace Invaders Extreme (Asia only)Shining HeartsShining BladeShinseiki Evangelion 2 -Another CasesShutokō BattleSoulCalibur: Broken DestinyStar Ocean: First DepartureStar Ocean: Second EvolutionSuper Robot Taisen MX PortableSuzumiya Haruhi no YakusokuSummon Night 3Summon Night 4Summon Night 5Tales of Destiny 2Tales of EterniaTales of PhantasiaTales of Phantasia: Narikiri Dungeon XTales of RebirthTales of the World: Radiant MythologyTales of the World: Radiant Mythology 2Tales of the World: Radiant Mythology 3TalkmanTalkman: EuroTekken: Dark ResurrectionTekken 6Tenchi no Mon (Asia Only)Tenchi no Mon 2: Busōden (Asia Only)Tenchu 4 PlusTenchu: Shinobi TaizenThe Idolm@ster SP: Missing MoonThe Idolm@ster SP: Perfect SunThe Idolm@ster SP: Wandering StarToaru Kagaku no Chō DenjihōToaru Majutsu no IndexToraDora! Portable!Toriko: Gourmet SurvivalToukidenValhalla KnightsValhalla Knights 2Valkyrie Profile: LennethVampire Chronicle: The Chaos TowerWinning Eleven 9: Ubiquitous EvolutionWinning Eleven 10: Ubiquitous EvolutionYs I & II ChroniclesYs SevenYs vs. Trails in the SkyYuusha 30Yūsha no Kuse ni NamaikidaYūsha no Kuse ni Namaikida Or 2Wild ARMs XFYūsha no Kuse ni Namaikida: 3DZ.H.P. Unlosing Ranger VS Darkdeath EvilmanZettai Zetsumei Toshi 3PlayStation VitaAkiba's Trip 2 (Asia only)Assassin's Creed III: Lady Liberty (Asia only)BioHazard: Revelations 2BlazBlue: Continuum Shift Extend (Asia only)Bullet GirlsChikyū Boueigun 3 PortableCiel Nosurge: Ushinawareta Hoshi e Sasagu UtaDai-3-Ji Super Robot Taisen Z Jigoku-henDanganronpa 1–2 ReloadDanganronpa Another Episode: Zettai Zetsubō ShōjoDead or Alive 5 Plus (Asia only)Demon GazeDragon Quest BuildersDream Club Zero PortableThe Legend of Heroes: Trails of Cold SteelFate/ExtellaFate/hollow ataraxiaFate/stay night Réalta NuaFreedom WarsGod Eater 2Gravity DazeGundam BreakerIA/VT ColorfulKatamari Damacy No-VitaKidō Senshi Gundam Seed Battle DestinyMahjong Fight Club: Shinsei Zenkoku Taisen HanMakai Senki Disgaea 3 ReturnMakai Senki Disgaea 4 ReturnMetal Gear Solid HD CollectionMinna no Golf 6Muramasa RebirthNew Danganronpa V3: Minna no Koroshiai ShingakkiNinja Gaiden Sigma Plus (Asia only)Ninja Gaiden Sigma Plus 2 (Asia only)Ore no Shikabane o Koete Yuke 2 Persona 4 GoldenRagnarok OdysseyRagnarok Odyssey ACE (Asia only)Ridge RacerSengoku Musou 4Shin Kamaitachi no Yoru: 11 Hitome no Suspect Shinobido 2: SangeShin Sangoku Musou NextSoul SacrificeSoul Sacrifice DeltaSword Art Online: Lost SongTales of Innocence RToukidenUncharted: Chizu no Bōken no HajimariYs: Memories of Celceta''

References

External links
 Official PlayStation the Best & Best for Family list (Japanese)
 Official PS one Books list (Japanese)
 Official PS one Books list from 2001–2002 (Japanese)
 Official PlayStation 2 the Best list (Japanese)
 Official PSP the Best list (Japanese)
 Official PlayStation 3 the Best list (Japanese)
 Official PlayStation Vita the Best (Japanese)
PlayStation 4 Greatest Hits list (English)

Budget ranges
 
 
 
PlayStation (brand)-related lists